Turoff is a surname. Notable people with the surname include:

 Murray Turoff (1936–2022), American computer science professor
 Nico Turoff (1899–1978), Ukrainian boxer and actor
 Alan Turoff (fl. 1970s), inventor of the word game, Boggle